Henry Adams (1813–1877) was an English naturalist and conchologist.

With his brother Arthur Adams, also a noted conchologist, he wrote The genera of recent Mollusca: arranged according to their organization three volumes, 1858.

His father is an architect hired by HM Customs.

References

English malacologists
English taxonomists
1813 births
1877 deaths
Conchologists
English zoologists
19th-century British zoologists